Epiphloeinae is a subfamily of checkered beetles in the family Cleridae. There are about 5 genera and at least 30 described species in Epiphloeinae.

Genera
These five genera belong to the subfamily Epiphloeinae:
 Corinthiscus Fairmaire & Germain, 1861
 Ichnea Laporte, 1836
 Madoniella Pic, 1935
 Pennasolis Opits, 2008
 Pyticeroides Kuwert, 1894

References

Further reading

 
 
 
 
 

Cleridae
Articles created by Qbugbot